NGC 513, also occasionally referred to as PGC 5174 or UGC 953, is a spiral galaxy in the constellation Andromeda. It is located approximately 262 million light-years from the Solar System and was discovered on 13 September 1784 by astronomer William Herschel.

Observation history 

Herschel discovered the object and simply noted "stellar". Therefore, the galaxy was probably mistaken for a star. Herschel discovered this galaxy along with many other objects on a single observation, using Beta Andromedae as a reference star. The position noted is correct and off only by approximately 30" from UGC 953, thus the objects are generally viewed as equivalents. John Louis Emil Dreyer, creator of the New General Catalogue, described the galaxy as "faint, small, stellar", still indicating the misidentification of NGC 513 as a star.

Description 
The galaxy has an apparent size of 0.9 × 0.6 arcmins and a recessional velocity of approximately 5807 kilometers per second. The redshift of 0.01956 allows an estimate of the galaxy's distance using Hubble's law, which puts the object at roughly 260 million light-years from the Sun.

See also 
 List of NGC objects (1–1000)

References

External links 

 
 SEDS

Spiral galaxies
Andromeda (constellation)
0513
5174
0953
Astronomical objects discovered in 1784
Discoveries by William Herschel